Hromádka is a Czech surname. Notable people with the surname include:

Eduard Hromádka (1909–1966), Czech alpine skier
Josef Hromádka (1889–1969), Czech Protestant theologian
Karel Hromádka (1887–1956), Czech chess player

Czech-language surnames